Nadia Forde (born 3 May 1989) is an Irish model, actor and TV personality of Italian descent. She participated in the fourteenth series of the hit British ITV show I'm a Celebrity...Get Me Out of Here!, starting on 16 November 2014 and ending on 2 December, finishing in ninth place. and has appeared in her own show Nadia Goes to Hollywood.

Early life
Forde was born in Dublin 3 May 1989; her mother was Berenice Paolozzi and she has one, younger, brother.  Her parents separated when she was 7, with one re-marrying and the other unable to bring up the two children.  She lived for a year with aunts in Clontarf and Leopardstown in Dublin, and was subsequently brought up in Clontarf by her grandmother, Bernadette Paulozzi.  She attended Holy Faith Secondary School, Clontarf.  Her mother died from lymphoma in June 2015.

Career
In 2013, Forde appeared on Ireland's The Late Late Show and presented Irish morning television. She has also appeared on nationwide radio stations, made theatrical appearances at Dublin's Tivoli Theatre, been a regular guest on RTE's The Republic of Telly and a contestant on TV3's Celebrity Salon in 2012.

During 2014, Forde starred in her own TV3 show Nadia Goes to Hollywood, documenting her time recording her first single and capturing her first acting role in the United States.

In August 2014, Forde made an appearance on the Oliver Callan spoof sketch show, Callan's Kicks'. In November 2014, it was announced that she would be taking part in the fourteenth series of the ITV hit show I'm a Celebrity...Get Me Out of Here!''. On 2 December she became the second celebrity to be evicted from the jungle.

In April 2015, a pilot for a reality show "Chasing The Dream" was broadcast in Ireland on 3e.

TV appearances

References

External links

1989 births
Living people
Irish female models
Television personalities from Dublin (city)
21st-century Irish women singers
Singers from Dublin (city)
Irish people of Italian descent
I'm a Celebrity...Get Me Out of Here! (British TV series) participants
Models from Dublin (city)